Tate Taylor (born June 3, 1969) is an American filmmaker and actor.  Taylor is best known for directing The Help (2011), Get on Up (2014), and The Girl on the Train (2016).

Early life
Taylor was born on June 3, 1969 in Jackson, Mississippi, where he grew up.

Career
Taylor worked for 15 years in New York City and Los Angeles. Though he debuted as a feature film director in Pretty Ugly People (2008), he was primarily an actor for most of his career, in films such as Romy and Michele's High School Reunion (1997) and Winter's Bone (2010), and on television in series such as Charmed, Six Feet Under, and The Drew Carey Show.

Taylor achieved mainstream success when he directed the film The Help (2011), based on Kathryn Stockett's novel of the same title. Stockett gave him rights to make the film adaptation in June 2008, before the book was published. In addition to receiving generally positive reviews, the film was a major commercial success, earning more than $200 million worldwide, and was nominated for the Academy Award for Best Picture. Tate Taylor has been nominated for and received industry awards including the 2013 Vail Film Festival Vanguard Award, the 2012 BAFTA Award for Best Adapted Screenplay nomination, the 2012 Writers Guild of America Award for Best Adapted Screenplay, the 2012 Critics' Choice Movie Award for Best Adapted Screenplay nomination, the 2012 NAACP Image Award nomination for Outstanding Directing in a Motion Picture and for Outstanding Writing in a Motion Picture, and the 2011 Chicago Film Critics Association nomination. Taylor next directed the James Brown biopic Get on Up (2014), which starred Chadwick Boseman. Though the film was a critical success, it commercially underperformed. His next project The Girl on the Train, an adaption of the book by Paula Hawkins, was released to mixed reviews from critics, but was a box office success.

In August 2018, Taylor was announced to be directing Jessica Chastain in action thriller film Ava. Taylor replaced original director Matthew Newton, who stepped down after controversy over allegations of domestic violence and assault.

In May 2019, Taylor released psychological horror film Ma, starring frequent collaborator Octavia Spencer. The film, produced by Jason Blum through his Blumhouse Productions banner, was a critical and commercial success. That same month, Fox ordered Taylor's first television project, Filthy Rich, to series. An American adaption of the New Zealand series starring Kim Cattrall, it premiered in September 2020 and was cancelled after one season.

Taylor's most recent film is Breaking News in Yuba County, starring frequent collaborator Allison Janney, was released on February 12, 2021.

Personal life
Taylor is openly gay and is in a relationship with producer John Norris. He resides on the Wyolah Plantation, an Antebellum plantation in Church Hill, Mississippi.

Filmography

Film

Television

Acting roles

References

External links 
 

1969 births
21st-century American male actors
Actors from Jackson, Mississippi
American male screenwriters
American male film actors
English-language film directors
Film directors from Mississippi
American gay actors
American gay writers
Living people
Male actors from Mississippi
LGBT film directors
American LGBT screenwriters
LGBT people from Mississippi
People from Jefferson County, Mississippi
Screenwriters from Mississippi
Writers from Jackson, Mississippi